The EMD DDM45 is a meter-gauge diesel-electric locomotive built by EMD. The DD in the name means that it has eight axles in two trucks, giving it a AAR wheel arrangement#D-D wheel arrangement, while the M stands for the meter-gauge track it was to operate on, and the 45 represents the EMD SD45 that the engine was derived from. They were built for service on the Estrada de Ferro Vitória a Minas (EFVM) in Brazil. In the early 1970s, the EFVM needed not only to expand its locomotive roster, but to use the most powerful single-engined locomotives available, and the SD45 represented the highest-rated model that EMD had to offer at the time.

However, a large locomotive like an SD45 with its three-axle trucks was not readily adaptable to the EFVM's meter gauge trackage. The smaller traction motors of the meter gauge locomotive were unable to handle the full current capacity from the  prime mover. EMD proposed using a meter-gauge version of the Flexicoil-D four-axle bogies, similar to those found under the domestic DD35, DD35A and DDA40X locomotive models. The two additional traction motors of this design allowed full power to be used.

Roster of DDM45s:

See also
 EMD DD35
 EMD DD35A
 EMD DDA40X

External links 

DDM45
D-D locomotives
Metre gauge diesel locomotives
Railway locomotives introduced in 1970
Diesel-electric locomotives of Brazil